The Police Stadium was a sports venue located in Berlin, Germany. It hosted several games of the handball tournament for the 1936 Summer Olympics.

References
1936 Summer Olympics official report. Volume 2. pp. 1067–73.

Venues of the 1936 Summer Olympics
Defunct sports venues in Germany
Olympic handball venues
Sports venues in Berlin